Kristen Joanne Caverly (born September 20, 1984) is an American former competitive swimmer and model who represented the United States at the 2004 Summer Olympics.

Caverly attended Stanford University, majoring in Psychology in the graduation class of 2006.

Caverly is a 4-time All American, 3-time national champion, and Pac-10 champion in swimming.

Caverly won a silver medal on the international stage at the 2003 Pan American Games in the 400-meter individual medley.  Caverly competed in the 200m Breaststroke at the 2005 FINA World Championships and placed sixth in the final.

Caverly competed for the US National Junior team in Barcelona in 1997, 2001 Goodwill Games in Australia, 2003 Pan American Games in Santo Domingo, 2004 Olympics in Athens, 2005 World Championships in Moscow, and 2006 Pan Pacific Games in Vitoria.

See also
 List of Stanford University people

References

External links
 
 
 
 
 Kristen Caverly – Stanford Cardinal athlete bio
 Kristen Caverly – Getty Images

1984 births
Living people
American female backstroke swimmers
American female medley swimmers
Olympic swimmers of the United States
Pan American Games silver medalists for the United States
Sportspeople from Mission Viejo, California
Stanford Cardinal women's swimmers
Swimmers at the 2003 Pan American Games
Swimmers at the 2004 Summer Olympics
Pan American Games medalists in swimming
Competitors at the 2001 Goodwill Games
Medalists at the 2003 Pan American Games
21st-century American women